Elliott Colla is an American scholar of the Middle East, specializing in Arabic literature and culture. He is currently an associate professor in the Department of Arabic and Islamic Studies at Georgetown University.

Career
Colla received a B.A. from University of California, Berkeley  in 1989 and his Ph.D. in Comparative literature as from Berkeley in 2000. His translation of Gold Dust was runner-up for the Banipal Prize in 2009.
He is a co-editor of the e-zine, Jadaliyya. His novel Baghdad Central was adapted into a television series of the same name in 2020.

Books
 Conflicted Antiquities: Egyptology, Egyptomania, Egyptian Modernity. Durham: Duke University Press, 2007.
 Baghdad Central London: Bitter Lemon Press, 2014.

Translations
 Ibrahim Aslan - The Heron Idris Ali - Poor Ibrahim al-Koni - Gold Dust Rabai Madhoun - The Lady from Tel Aviv''

Further reading
Looking for the Three of Diamonds MERIP.
The Poetry of Revolt jadaliyya e-zine.
The People Want MERIP.
The Persistence of Jokes jadaliyya e-zine.
Walls jadaliyya e-zine.
"The Poetry of Revolt” in the New Egypt Radio Open Source.

See also
List of Arabic-English translators

References

External links
author webpage
Georgetown University Biography
Banipal Biography

Middle Eastern studies scholars
American translators
Arabic–English translators
Living people
UC Berkeley College of Letters and Science alumni
Georgetown University faculty
Year of birth missing (living people)